The County of Isenburg was a region of Germany located in southern present-day Hesse, located in territories north and south of Frankfurt. The states of Isenburg emerged from the Niederlahngau (located in the Rhineland-Palatinate), which partitioned in 1137 into Isenburg-Isenburg and Isenburg-Limburg-Covern. These countships were partitioned between themselves many times over the next 700 years.

House of Isenburg

The House of Isenburg was an old aristocratic family of medieval Germany, named after the castle of Isenburg in Rhineland-Palatinate. Occasionally referred to as the House of Rommersdorf before the 12th century, the house originated in the Hessian comitatus of the Niederlahngau in the 10th century. It partitioned into the lines of Isenburg-Isenburg and Isenburg-Limburg-Covern in 1137, before partitioning again into smaller units, but by 1500 only the lines of Isenburg-Büdingen (in Upper Isenburg) and Lower Isenburg remained. In 1664 the Lower Isenburg branch died out. The Büdingen line continued to partition, and by the beginning of the 19th century the lines of Isenburg-Büdingen, Isenburg-Birstein, Isenburg-Meerholz and Isenburg-Wächtersbach existed. Today still exist the (Roman Catholic) princes of Isenburg (at Birstein), the (Lutheran) princes of Ysenburg (at Büdingen and Ronneburg) and the (Lutheran) counts of Ysenburg-Philippseich.

"Family tree" of the Isenburg countships

Isenburg, the original countship was divided upon the death of Count Rembold II in 1137 into: 
Isenburg (or Isenburg-Isenburg), 1137–1199, eventually dividing c. 1210 into: 
Isenburg-Braunsberg, 1210–1388, when it was renamed Isenburg-Wied. Isenburg-Wied, in turn, existed from 1388–1454, when it passed by marriage to the Lords of Runkel and was superseded by the Countship of Wied in 1462.
Nieder-Isenburg (Lower Isenburg), 1218–1502 when it was divided into:
Isenburg-Grenzau, 1502–1664. After the death of Count Ernest in 1664 without direct heirs, his territories were claimed back as feudal tenures by the Archbishoprics of Cologne and Trier, and the Abbey-principality of Fulda. The core territories including Isenburg were passed on by Fulda to the Counts of Walderdorff. They had to share them according to a later agreement with the Counts of Wied, by then a cadet branch of the Isenburgs.
Isenburg-Neumagen, 1502–1554, when it passed by marriage to the Counts of Sayn-Homburg.
Isenburg-Kempenich, 1137–1424, when it passed to the Lords of Schöneck. In 1434, it passed to the Archbishop of Trier, who sold the territory to the Counts of Virneburg.
Isenburg-Limburg-Covern, 1137–1158, when it was divided into:
Isenburg-Covern, 1158–1306, when it passed to Isenburg-Cleberg.
Isenburg-Grenzau, 1158–1258, when it was divided into:
Isenburg-Limburg, 1258–1406, when it was annexed by the Archbishopric of Trier 
Isenburg-Grenzau, 1258–1287, when it was divided into:
Isenburg-Grenzau, 1287–1290, when it passed to Isenburg-Cleberg.
Isenburg-Arnfels, 1286–1379, when it passed to Isenburg-Wied.
Isenburg-Cleberg, 1287–1340, when it was divided into:
Isenburg-Grenzau, 1340–1439, when it passed to Nassau-Beilstein. It subsequently passed to the Archbishopric of Trier in 1446, and was finally purchased by the Counts of Nieder-Isenburg in 1460.
Isenburg-Büdingen, 1340–1511, when it was divided into:
Isenberg-Büdingen-Ronneburg, or Isenburg-Ronneburg, 1511–1601, when it was annexed by Isenburg-Büdingen-Birstein
Isenburg-Büdingen-Birstein (or Isenburg-Birstein), 1511–1628, which was divided into: 
Isenburg-Birstein, 1628–1664, when it passed to Isenburg-Offenbach
Isenburg-Büdingen, 1628–1685, when it was divided into: 
Isenburg-Büdingen, 1685–1806, when it was mediatized to the Principality of Isenburg
Isenburg-Wächtersbach, 1685–1806, when it was mediatized to the Principality of Isenburg
Isenburg-Meerholz, 1685–1806, when it was mediatized to the Principality of Isenburg
Isenburg-Marienborn, 1685–1725
Isenburg-Offenbach, 1628–1711, when it was divided into:
Isenburg-Birstein, 1711–1744, when it became the Principality of Isenburg-Birstein. The Principality existed from 1744-1806, when it was renamed the Principality of Isenburg, 1806–1814/5
Isenburg-Eisenberg, 1711–1758, when it was absorbed back into the Principality of Isenburg-Birstein
Isenburg-Philippseich, 1711–1806, when it was mediatized to the Principality of Isenburg

Principality of Isenburg

It was not until 1806 that there was a state called simply "Isenburg". When the Holy Roman Empire was defeated by Napoleon I of France in that year, the empire was abolished and the Confederation of the Rhine was established amongst the various German states. As an incentive to join the Confederation, it was stated that any state which joined could mediatise their neighbours. Prince Charles of Isenburg-Birstein joined the Confederation and was granted the mediatized Isenburgian Countships of Isenburg-Büdingen, Isenburg-Meerholz, Isenburg-Philippseich, and Isenburg-Wächtersbach. His Principality was renamed to Isenburg.

The Principality continued under the rule of Prince Charles through the Napoleonic era, but was mediatised by Austria in December 1813, at the insistence of King Frederick William III of Prussia, who was angered that Isenburg had raised a regiment for French service by recruiting Prussian deserters and vagabonds. Isenburg was one of only three original member princes of the Empire to be mediatized at the end of the Napoleonic era (the others being Leyen and prince-primate Dalberg, Prince of Aschaffenburg). This decision was confirmed at the Congress of Vienna. The lands of the principality were divided between the Grand Duchy of Hesse-Darmstadt and the Electorate of Hesse-Kassel (or Hesse-Cassel).

Rulers

House of Isenburg

Partitions of Isenburg under House of Isenburg rule

Table of rulers

Lines of succession

Mediatized line of Birstein (1815) 

  Charles, 1st Prince 1803-1820 (1766-1820)
 Wolfgang Ernst, 2nd Prince 1820-1866 (1798-1866)
  Prince Victor (1802-1843)
  Karl, 3rd Prince 1866-1899 (1838-1899)
 Prince Leopold (1866-1933) -renounced his rights in 1898
  Franz Joseph, 4th Prince 1899-1939 (1869-1939)
  Franz Ferdinand, 5th Prince 1939-1956 (1901-1956)
  Franz Alexander, 6th Prince 1956–2018 (1943-2018)
 Alexander, 7th Prince 2018–present (1969) ∞ Sarah Lorenz
 Princess Alix (2015)
 Princess Zita (2017)
  Franz Salvator, Hereditary Prince (2019)
 Princess Katharina (1971) ∞ Archduke Martin of Austria 
 Princess Isabelle (1973) ∞ Carl, Prince of Wied
 Princess Sophie (1978) ∞ Georg Friedrich, Prince of Prussia
  Prince Viktor (1979) ∞ Jungeun Anes Lee
 Princess Amalia (2016)
  Princess Victoria (2018)

Mediatized line of Büdingen (1806) 

Ernest Casimir III (1806-1848), in 1840 he was raised to Prince.
Ernest Casimir IV (1848-1861)
Bruno (1861-1906)
Wolfgang (1906-1920)
Alfred (1920-1922)
Karl (1922-1941)
Otto Friedrich (1904-1990), from the Ysenburg-Büdingen-Wächtersbach branch, adopted by Karl in 1936

  Wolfgang-Ernst, 8th Prince 1990- (b.1936) ∞ Leonille Princess of Sayn-Wittgenstein-Berleburg
 Hereditary Prince Casimir-Alexander (b.1967)
  Prince Tristan Alexander (b.2014)
  Prince Maximilian (b.1969)
  Prince Tassilo-Alexander (b.2006)

Notable members of the family 
 Imagina of Isenburg-Limburg, c. 1255 – 29 September 1313?, Queen consort of Adolf of Nassau, king of Germany
 Diether von Isenburg, c. 1412 – 1482, Elector and Archbishop of Mainz 
 Anna of Isenburg-Büdingen, 1460 – 1522
 John of Isenburg-Grenzau, Archbishop-Elector of Trier from 1547 until 1556
 Salentin IX of Isenburg-Grenzau, c. 1532–1610, Archbishop-Elector of Cologne, Bishop of Paderborn
 Ernst Casimir II, 2nd Prince of Ysenburg and Büdingen, 1806-1861
 Bruno, 3rd Prince of Ysenburg and Büdingen, 1837-1906
 Princess Sophie Johanna Maria of Isenburg (born 1978), wife of Georg Friedrich, Prince of Prussia

References

Works cited

External links
 Official Website – Fürstenhaus Isenburg (Princely House of Isenburg) 

County of Isenburg
States of the Confederation of the Rhine
Former states and territories of Rhineland-Palatinate
Counties of the Holy Roman Empire
Upper Rhenish Circle